ROCO, formerly the River Oaks Chamber Orchestra, is  a Houston (TX) based Chamber Orchestra founded in 2005 by Principal Oboist Alecia Lawyer. Now in its 13th season, as of April 26, 2017  the program includes classical music as well as compositions from contemporary composers (e.g. Carter Pann). The participating musicians represent outstanding players from the national professional community. Among the conductors are JoAnn Falletta,  Joel Smirnoff, Mei Ann Chen and Alastair Willis. ROCO performs occasionally without conductor.

Bibliography
 "Orchestra marks third season" by Arlene Nission Lassin, Houston Chronicle, July 16, 2008
 "Got Kids?" - Symphony Magazine, March April, 2008
 "River Oaks Chamber Orchestra leads without being led" by Charles Ward, Houston Chronicle, February 2, 2008
 "Multi-sensory music experiences for multi-generations" by Cynthia Lescalleet, Bellaire Examiner, November 9, 2007
 "It's never too early to develop an ear for music" by Tara Dooley, Houston Chronicle, November 6, 2007
 "River Oaks Chamber Orchestra's founder honored with Gutsy Gal Award" by Kim James, Houston Woman Magazine, July, 2007
 "Bringing Chamber Back: Alecia Lawyer for the Love of Music" by Chris Dunn, ArtsHouston, March 2007

References

External links
 Arts Houston, May 30, 2008
 
 
 River Oaks Chamber Orchestra website

Culture of Houston
Texas classical music
Music of Houston
Tourist attractions in Houston
Musical groups established in 2005
Orchestras based in Texas
River Oaks, Houston